James A. Russell is an American psychologist whose work focuses on emotion. In 2009, Russell was ranked 35th in terms of citation impact in social psychology.

Selected publications

Books
 Barrett, L. F., & Russell, J. A., Eds. (2015).  The psychological construction of emotion. New York: Guilford Press.
 Russell, J. A., Ed. (2003).  Pleasure.  Andover, Hampshire U.K.: Routledge: Taylor & Francis Group.

Articles

See also 
 Facial expression
 Facial Action Coding System
 Affect display
 Emotions and culture

References

External links 
 James A. Russell Google Scholar profile
 Faculty page at Boston College
 Research website--Emotion Development Lab
 Profile in Boston College newspaper
 Presentation on "Language, emotion, and facial expression" given at the Copernicus Center for Interdisciplinary Studies in Krakow, Poland

Emotion psychologists
21st-century American psychologists
Social psychologists
Living people
1947 births
20th-century American psychologists